Dmitri Sergeyevich Shikhovtsev (born 7 April 1986) is a former Russian football defender.

Club career
Born in Moscow, he played in the youth and reserves team of FC Dynamo Moscow between 1999 and 2006.

He made his Russian Football National League debut for FC Tekstilshchik-Telekom Ivanovo on 2 August 2007 in a game against FC Ural Yekaterinburg.

In February 2009 he moved abroad and joined FK Radnički 1923 in the Serbian First League playing with them during the second half of the 2008-09 season and the 2009-10 season in which the club used the name FK Šumadija Radnički during the first part of the season after a merger with another local club.

In early 2012 Dmitri Shikhovtsev joined FC Saturn Moscow Oblast playing in the Russian Second Division.

References

External links
 Dmitri Shikhovtsev profile and entire career at FC Saturn official website
 Career summary by sportbox.ru
 

1986 births
Living people
Footballers from Moscow
Russian footballers
Association football defenders
FC Dynamo Moscow reserves players
FC Saturn Ramenskoye players
FK Radnički 1923 players
Russian expatriate footballers
Expatriate footballers in Serbia
Serbian First League players
FC Tekstilshchik Ivanovo players